Battle of the Nile was a victory by Nelson in 1798.

Battle of the Nile may also refer to:
Battle of the Delta, a victory by Rameses III around 1175 BC
Battle of the Nile (47 BC), a victory by Caesar and Cleopatra

See also 
Battle of Abukir (disambiguation)